This is a list of notable past and present kickboxing organizations.

List of promotions 
Active
  Absolute Championship Akhmat (ACA)
  Colosseum Tournament
  Dynamite Fighting Show (DFS)
  Enfusion 
  Final Fight Championship (FFC)
  Glory
  Glory of Heroes
  Golden Fighter Championship (GFC) 
  K-1
  King in the Ring
  King of Kings (KOK)
  KO Masters
  Krush
  Kunlun Fight 
  Lion Fight
  ONE Championship
  OSS Fighters 
  Prometheus Fighting Promotion
  RISE 
  Rizin Fighting Federation
  TatNeft Cup
  Wu Lin Feng   

Defunct 
  Bellator Kickboxing
  Global Fighting Championship
  It's Showtime
  REBELS
  Strikeforce
  World Version W5

See also 
List of boxing organisations

References

Lists of sports organizations
Organizations